The 2005 Montreal municipal election was held on November 6, 2005, to elect a city mayor, borough mayors, city councillors, and borough councillors in Montreal, Quebec, Canada. In the contest for mayor of Montreal, Gérald Tremblay was elected to a second term over former mayor Pierre Bourque.

Results

City mayor

Borough mayors

Composition of city and borough councils

Depending on their borough, Montrealers voted for:
 
 Mayor of Montreal
 Borough mayor, who is also a city councillor
 A city councillor for the whole borough or for each district, who is also a borough councillor (Outremont and L'Île-Bizard–Sainte-Geneviève have no city councillors other than the borough mayor)
 Zero, one, or two additional borough councillors for each district

Seat-by-seat results

Ahuntsic-Cartierville

Anjou

Côte-des-Neiges–Notre-Dame-de-Grâce

L'Île-Bizard–Sainte-Geneviève

Lachine

LaSalle

Mercier–Hochelaga-Maisonneuve

Montréal-Nord

Outremont

Pierrefonds-Roxboro

Le Plateau-Mont-Royal

Rivière-des-Prairies–Pointe-aux-Trembles

Rosemont–La Petite-Patrie

Saint-Laurent

Saint-Léonard

Le Sud-Ouest

Verdun

Ville-Marie

Villeray–Saint-Michel–Parc-Extension

Source: Election results, 1833-2005 (in French), City of Montreal.

Post-election changes
Pierre Bourque resigned as councillor for Marie-Victorin in 2006. A by-election was held to choose his replacement on September 24, 2006.

Frank Zampino resigned as borough mayor of Saint-Leonard in 2008. He was replaced on an interim basis by Yvette Bissonnet. A by-election to choose a permanent replacement was held on September 21, 2008.

Pierre Lapointe, city councillor for Ahuntsic, died on April 12, 2008. A by-election to choose his replacement was held on September 21, 2008.

References

2005 Quebec municipal elections
Municipal elections in Montreal
2000s in Montreal
2005 in Quebec
November 2005 events in Canada